Spain competed at the 2012 Summer Olympics in London, from 27 July to 12 August 2012. This nation has competed in all but two Summer Olympic Games since its official debut in 1920. Spain boycotted two editions, the 1936 Summer Olympics in Nazi Germany and the 1956 Summer Olympics in Melbourne, as a protest against the Soviet invasion of Hungary.  In 2012, the Spanish Olympic Committee sent the nation's smallest delegation to the Games since 1988.  A total of 278 athletes, 166 men and 112 women, competed in 23 sports.

Spain left London with a total of 17 Olympic medals (3 gold, 10 silver, and 4 bronze), failing short of the total achieved in Beijing by a single medal. Three of the medals were awarded in taekwondo and canoeing, and two each in sailing, swimming, and synchronized swimming. Three Spanish athletes won more than a single medal in London, while all of their competitors in synchronized swimming and taekwondo won at least one medal. Spain's competitors in team sports also proved successful in London, as the women's handball and water polo teams won silver and bronze medals respectively. The men's basketball team managed to repeat its silver medal from Beijing. Spain, however, did not win an Olympic medal in tennis for the first time since it was reintroduced as a full-medal sport in 1988, and in cycling for the first time since that same year. On 21 November 2016, a fourth gold medal was assigned to Spain's Lydia Valentín in Weightlifting (Women's 75 kg) after the IOC disqualified the original medallists in the event for failing doping tests at the Games. In 2021, another two bronze medals were assigned to Spain's Ruth Beitia in Athletics high jump and Alfonso Benavides in Canoeing C-1 200 metres after the IOC disqualified the original bronze medalists in the events for failing doping tests at the Games. These make Spain finally get 20 medals with 4 golds.

Among the nation's medallists were sailor Marina Alabau in women's windsurfing, and sprint kayaker Saúl Craviotto, who previously won gold in Beijing. Three athletes won Spain's first ever Olympic medals in their respective disciplines: triathlete Javier Gómez Noya, slalom kayaker Maialen Chourraut, and freestyle wrestler Maider Unda. Sprint canoer David Cal, who won silver in London, became the first Spanish athlete in history to win a total of five Olympic medals.  Meanwhile, Mireia Belmonte became the first Spanish swimmer in history to win two Olympic medals.

Medalists

| width="78%" align="left" valign="top" |

| width="22%" align="left" valign="top" |

Delegation 
The Spanish Olympic Committee (COE) selected a team of 278 athletes, 166 men and 112 women, to compete in 23 sports; it was the nation's sixth-largest team sent to the Olympics, but the smallest since 1988. Spain did not qualify athletes in fencing, modern pentathlon, and rowing, but there was only a single competitor in women's freestyle wrestling. Athletics was the largest team by sport, with a total of 46 competitors.

The Spanish team featured several Olympic medalists from Beijing, including sailors Iker Martínez and Xabier Fernández in the open skiff class, and sprint canoer David Cal, who won the silver in two of his events. Race walker Jesús Ángel García became the second Spanish athlete to compete in six Olympic Games, tying the record set by former water polo player Manuel Estiarte. Meanwhile, another race walker María Vasco, and field hockey player Pablo Amat competed at their fifth Olympics. Table tennis player He Zhi Wen, at age 50, was the oldest athlete of the team, while rhythmic gymnast Lourdes Mohedano was the youngest at age 17.

Other notable Spanish athletes featured sprint kayaker and two-time world champion Saúl Craviotto, swimmer Mireia Belmonte in the women's medley, butterfly, and freestyle events, tennis doubles specialist Anabel Medina Garrigues, and NBA basketball players Víctor Claver and Serge Ibaka. Former world number-one male tennis player and defending Olympic champion Rafael Nadal was initially selected by the committee to carry the nation's flag, but he later withdrew from the Games because of an undisclosed injury. On 20 July 2012, NBA basketball star Pau Gasol, who led his team by winning the silver medal in Beijing, replaced Nadal as Spain's flag bearer at the opening ceremony.

The following is the list of number of competitors participating in the Games. Note that reserves for fencing, field hockey, football, and handball are not counted as athletes:

Archery

Spain had qualified one archer each in the men's and women's individual events.

Athletics

Spanish athletes qualified standards in the following athletics events (up to a maximum of 3 athletes in each event at the 'A' Standard, and 1 at the 'B' Standard):

Men
Track & road events

Field events

Women
Track & road events

Field events

Badminton

Basketball

Spain's men basketball team qualified for the event by reaching the final of the EuroBasket 2011.
 Men's team event – 1 team of 12 players

Men's tournament

Roster

Group play

Quarter-final

Semi-final

Gold medal match

Boxing

Spain qualified boxers for the following events.

Men

Canoeing

Slalom
Spain qualified boats for the following events.

Sprint
Spain qualified boats for the following events

Qualification Legend: FA = Qualify to final (medal); FB = Qualify to final B (non-medal)

Cycling

Spain qualified riders for the following events.

Road

Track
Sprint

Pursuit

Keirin

Omnium

Mountain biking

Diving

Spain qualified two divers:

Men

Women

Equestrian

Dressage
Spain qualified one team and three individual quota places after finishing in fifth place at the 2011 European Dressage Championship.

Field hockey

 Men's team event – 1 team of 16 players

Men's tournament

Roster

Group play

5th/6th place game

Football

Spain's men football team qualified for the event by reaching the final of the 2011 UEFA European Under-21 Football Championship.
 Men's team event – 1 team of 18 players

Men's tournament

Team roster

Group play

Gymnastics

Artistic
Men
Team

Individual finals

Women

Rhythmic

Handball

 Men's team event – 1 team of 14 players
 Women's team event – 1 team of 14 players

Men's tournament

Team roster

Group play

Quarterfinal

Women's tournament

Team roster

Group play

Quarterfinal

Semifinal

Bronze medal game

Judo

Men

Women

Sailing

Spain qualified 1 boat for each of the following events

Men

Women

Match racing

Open

M = Medal race; EL = Eliminated – did not advance into the medal race;

Shooting

Spain qualified for 8 quota places in shooting events;

Men

Women

Swimming

Spanish swimmers achieved qualifying standards in the following events (up to a maximum of 2 swimmers in each event at the Olympic Qualifying Time (OQT), and 1 at the Olympic Selection Time (OST)):

Men

Women

Synchronized swimming

Spain qualified 9 quota places in synchronized swimming at the 2012 Olympics.

Table tennis

Spain qualified two athlete for singles table tennis events. Shen Yanfei qualified for the women's event based on the 2011 world rankings. On 14 April 2012, He Zhi Wen qualified in the European Qualification Tournament for the men's event, and on 14 May 2012 at the World Olympic Qualification Tournament in Doha, Carlos Machado for the men's event; Galia Dvorak and Sara Ramírez completed the Spanish team for the women's team event, and one of them played the women's event too.

Taekwondo

Tennis

Spain qualified 12 players. The final list was announced on 11 June 2012.

Men

Women

Triathlon

Spain qualified six athletes, the maximum as possible.

Volleyball

Beach

Water polo

Spain qualified a team to both the men's and the women's tournaments.

Men's tournament

Team roster

Group play

Quarterfinal

Classification semifinal

5th place game

Women's tournament

Team roster

Group play

Quarterfinal

Semifinal

Gold medal game

Weightlifting

Spain qualified 1 man and 1 woman.

Wrestling

Women's freestyle

Uniform controversy
As Spain was suffering from the 2008–2014 financial crisis, the Spanish Olympic team saved EUR1.5 million by obtaining free uniforms for the opening ceremony from the Russian sportswear company Bosco, which was a team sponsor and also provided the Russian and Ukrainian teams' outfits. Spanish athletes criticized the outfits' appearance as "loud, very loud", however, saying that "there aren't enough adjectives". The Moscow Times described the uniforms' colors as "a never-before-seen mix of cherry red, orange and canary yellow", and NPR stated that the outfits appeared designed for Ronald McDonald.

See also
 Spain at the 2012 Summer Paralympics

References

2012 in Spanish sport
Nations at the 2012 Summer Olympics
2012